Al-Imran is a Bangladeshi cricketer. He made his List A debut for Sheikh Jamal Dhanmondi Club in the 2017–18 Dhaka Premier Division Cricket League on 7 February 2018.

References

External links
 

Year of birth missing (living people)
Living people
Bangladeshi cricketers
Sheikh Jamal Dhanmondi Club cricketers
Place of birth missing (living people)